Amadou Salif Mbengue (born 5 January 2002) is a professional footballer who plays as a Centre Back for  club Reading.

Club career 

Amadou Mbengue was part of FC Melun's youth setup, before joining the FC Metz academy.

He made his professional debut for Metz on 3 October 2021 during a 3–2 Ligue 1 away loss against Angers; where he came on as an early substitute for Sikou Niakaté, who was, injured after a tackle from Mohamed-Ali Cho.

Reading
On 13 September 2022, Reading confirmed the signing of Mbengue on a short-term contract until January 2023 after training with the club since leaving Metz during the summer of 2022. He scored his first goal for the club, and his first professional goal, on 10 December 2022 in a 1–0 win against Coventry City.
On 13 January 2023, Reading announced that Mbengue had extended his contract with the club until the end of the season, with a view to a further extension.

Career statistics

References

External links

2002 births
Living people
Senegalese footballers
Association football defenders
Association football midfielders
FC Metz players
Ligue 1 players
Championnat National 2 players
Senegalese expatriate footballers
Senegalese expatriates in France
Expatriate footballers in France
FC Melun players
Reading F.C. players
Senegalese expatriates in England
Expatriate footballers in England

English Football League players